Fruit spirit (or fruit brandy) is a distilled beverage produced from mash, juice, wine or residues of edible fruits. The term covers a broad class of spirits produced across the world, and typically excludes beverages made from grapes, which are referred to as plain brandy (when made from distillation from wine) or pomace brandy (when made directly from grape pomace). Apples, pears, apricots, plums and cherries are the most commonly used fruits.

Definition
According to a legal definition in the United States, a "fruit brandy" is distilled "solely from the fermented juice or mash of whole, sound, ripe fruit, or from standard grape, citrus, or other fruit wine, with or without the addition of not more than 20 percent by weight of the pomace of such juice or wine, or 30 percent by volume of the lees of such wine, or both."

In the European Union, fruit spirits may not be labeled as "fruit brandy"; instead, the legal English denomination is fruit spirit, which is "produced exclusively by the alcoholic fermentation and distillation of fleshy fruit or must of such fruit, berries or vegetables, with or without stones". A great number of European fruit spirits have a protected designation of origin, and are labeled with their respective protected names instead of "fruit spirit" ("apricot spirit", etc.). Cider spirit and perry spirit (fruit spirit distilled from cider or perry) form a separate legal category. Some fruit spirits may be labeled with alternative names such as kirsch (cherry spirit) or slivovitz (plum spirit) regardless their country of origin. The term Cider Brandy is PGI protected within Europe and the United Kingdom and refers specifically to the products of the Somerset Cider Brandy Company; these Cider Brandies are mainly sold at 42% ABV alongside a number of derivative products.

In British usage, "fruit brandy" may also refer to liqueurs obtained by maceration of whole fruits, juice or flavoring in a distilled beverage, and such liqueurs are legally labeled as "cherry brandy", "apricot brandy" etc. all across the European Union. Such beverages are used similar to cordials, and as an ingredient in cocktails and cakes. Fruit spirits obtained by distillation are often referred by the French term eau de vie.

Fruit spirit usually contains 40% to 45% ABV (80 to 90 US proof). It is often colourless. Fruit spirit is customarily drunk chilled or over ice, but is occasionally mixed.

Types

Including some of the above, there are about 80 different kinds of fruit spirits in the European Union, registered with protected designations of origin from Germany, France, Italy, Portugal, Luxembourg, Austria, Hungary, Slovakia, Bulgaria, Romania and Spain. Most of these fruit spirits are named after their region of origin and base ingredients. For example: Schwarzwälder Kirschwasser (cherry spirit of the Black Forest), Framboise d'Alsace (raspberry of Alsace), Aprikot dell'Alto Adige (apricot of South Tyrol), etc. They are often regulated more strictly than generic fruit spirits; other than limiting their region of origin, restrictions may include fruit variants, mashing and fermenting technology, distilling apparatus, barrel aging, etc.

Among the better known fruit spirits are:
Applejack is an American apple spirit made from the distillation of hard cider. It was once made by fractional freezing which would disqualify it as a proper brandy.
Brinjevec is a Slovenian spirit distilled from ground and fermented juniper berries.
Buchu is a South African spirit flavoured with extracts from Agathosma species.
Calvados is an apple spirit from the French region of Lower Normandy.
Coconut brandy is actually made from the sap of palmyra palm flowers.
Damassine brandy is made with the prune fruit of the Damassinier tree in the Jura Mountains of Switzerland.
Eau de vie is a French term for colorless fruit spirit. This term is also applied to grape-based brandy other than Armagnac and Cognac. 
Himbeergeist is a raspberry-based spirit produced mainly in Germany and the Alsace region of France as an infusion of macerated fruit in neutral spirit which is then distilled. While not a true fruit brandy (its correct denomination is Geist), it is typically referred to as a form of Schnaps.
Kirschwasser is a fruit spirit made from cherries.
Kukumakranka is a South African spirit flavored with the fruit of the Kukumakranka plant.
Marpha is a Nepalese fruit brandy produced in the Himalayan region of Mustang district.
 Obstler is a German word for fruit spirit (Schnaps), often referred to as "Schnapps" in English.
Pálenka or "Pálené" is a common traditional description for Slovak spirit. It must be distilled from Slovakian wild or domestic fruits.
Pálinka is a traditional Hungarian fruit spirit . It can only be made with fruits from Hungary, such as plums, apricots, peaches, elderberries, pears, apples, or cherries.
Poire Williams is made from the Williams pear, also known as the Bartlett pear.
Rakia is a type of fruit spirit produced in Albania, Bosnia and Herzegovina, Bulgaria, Croatia, North Macedonia, Montenegro and Serbia: it may be made from plums, apples, quinces, pears, apricots, cherries, mulberries, or grapes.
Slivovitz is a straw to yellow-colored plum spirit produced in Bosnia and Herzegovina, Bulgaria, Croatia, Czech Republic, Macedonia, Poland, Serbia, Slovakia, and Slovenia.
Somerset Cider Brandy an apple brandy which dates back to 1678 and which obtained European protected status in 2011.
Țuică, also known as horincă or turţ, is a clear Romanian plum spirit. Other Romanian fruit spirits, often distilled from apples, pears, apricots, mulberries, peaches, quinces, or mixtures of these, are colloquially known as Rachiu.

See also
Cordial
Aperitif

References

 
Distilled drinks